The 2018 FINA Diving World Series, also known as the FINA/CNSG Diving World Series for sponsorship reasons, took place from 9 March to 6 May 2018. It was the tenth edition of the FINA-sanctioned invitational series, and included four events across three continents.

Calendar

The calendar for the 2018 series was announced by FINA in September 2017.

Overall medal table

Event 1:  Beijing

The first event took place at the National Aquatics Center in Beijing, China from 9–11 March.

Medal table

Medal summary

Men

Women

Mixed

Event 2:  Fuji

The second event took place at the Shizuoka Prefectural Swimming Pools in Fuji, Japan from 15 to 17 March.

Medal table

Medal summary

Men

Women

Mixed

Event 3:  Montreal

The third event took place at the Olympic Park in Montreal, Canada from 27 to 29 April.

Medal table

Medal summary

Men

Women

Mixed

Event 4:  Kazan

The fourth and final event took place at the Aquatics Palace in Kazan, Russia from 4–6 May.

Medal table

Medal summary

Men

Women

Mixed

See also

2018 FINA Diving World Cup

References

External links

FINA Diving World Series
FINA Diving World Series